Aneesh Anwar is an Indian director, screenwriter, and lyricist known for his works in the Malayalam film industry.

Early life 
Aneesh was born in Thalassery, Kerala on 30 June 1981. He completed his schooling in Jawaharlal Nehru GHSS, Mahe and graduated from Mahatma College in Thalassery.

Career 
Aneesh started his film career in 2000 as an associate director with prominent filmmakers such as Joshiy and Bhadran. He started off with Joshiy's Dubai and went on to assist him in blockbusters like Praja, Mampazhakalam, Naran, and Runway.

Aneesh made his directorial debut with the movie Mullamottum munthiricharum (2012) with Indrajith, Meghana Raj, and Ananya in the lead roles. The film was met with mostly negative reviews and was left unnoticed. He rose to fame with his second film, Zachariayude Garbhinikal (2013), which was well received by critics. The film took 4 Kerala State film awards that year, including the award for the best actor. His third movie, Kumbasaram, was released in 2015. Even though the movie received mixed reviews, it has been considered the best of his three movies. Jayasurya's performance in the movie was well applauded by critics.

Filmography

Awards and nominations

References 
 http://www.imdb.com/name/nm5965286/
 http://www.cochintalkies.com/celebrity/aneesh-anwar.html
 https://www.youtube.com/watch?v=JzLU2bGGyYo
 http://timesofindia.indiatimes.com/entertainment/malayalam/movies/news/I-am-happy-that-a-novel-premise-got-noticed-Aneesh-Anwar/articleshow/34007339.cms

Film directors from Kerala
Indian lyricists
1981 births
Living people
Malayalam film directors
People from Thalassery